Gubernatorial elections in 2000 took place in 41 regions of the Russian Federation. Four years after the campaign of 1996 nearly a half of 89 governors' seats were contested again.

In January, the second rounds of the December 1999 elections took place in Moscow, Novosibirsk and Tver Oblasts. In seven regions, the elections were moved to the federal election day on 26 March 2000 due to cost reasons. In October 2000, the last parliamentary republic in the Russian Federation, Udmurtia, elected its first president.

Race summary

Literature

Notes

References

Gubernatorial elections in Russia
2000 elections in Russia